The 2008 North Queensland Cowboys season was the 14th season in the club's history. They were coached by Graham Murray and captained by Johnathan Thurston, they competed in the National Rugby League's 2008 Telstra Premiership.

On 19 May, Murray resigned as head coach after just three wins from the opening 10 games. He was replaced by assistant coach Ian Millward, who took over as interim head coach until the end of the season. The Cowboys finished the season in 15th place, avoiding the wooden spoon by points differential.

Season summary 
The Cowboys entered the 2008 season optimistic about the finals chances after a preliminary final appearance in 2007. The club got off to the worst possible start, losing three straight games. They would win their next three but it proved to be a false dawn, as the side went on a club record 13-game losing streak. They finished the season with two wins from their final five games, finishing in 15th place and narrowly avoiding the wooden spoon. The season was plagued by injury, with key players Matthew Bowen, Luke O'Donnell, Matthew Scott and Johnathan Thurston all missing considerable playing time due to injuries.

On April 2, the Cowboys signed former assistant coach and then-Canberra Raiders coach Neil Henry as their head coach for the 2009 season. A month later, Graham Murray re-signed as head coach and was replaced by his assistant Ian Millward as interim head coach for the rest of 2008. Millward's first win as head coach occurred in Round 22, as the Cowboys defeated the Canterbury Bulldogs 36-12 at Suncorp Stadium.

Despite the poor season, the club still maintained the fourth highest home crowd average in the NRL with an average of 18,102.

Milestones 
 Round 1: Matthew Scott played his 50th game for the club.
 Round 1: Travis Burns and Ben Harris made their debuts for the club.
 Round 2: Dayne Weston made his debut for the club.
 Round 2: Obe Geia made his NRL debut.
 Round 4: Anthony Watts and John Williams made their debuts for the club.
 Round 8: Daniel Abraham made his debut for the club.
 Round 14: Nick Slyney made his NRL debut.
 Round 15: Greg Byrnes made his NRL debut.
 Round 16: Ashley Graham played his 50th game for the club.
 Round 16: Brandon Boor and Sam Bowie made their NRL debuts.
 Round 19: Luke Harlen made his debut for the club.
 Round 21: The club recorded their longest losing streak with their 13th straight loss.
 Round 22: Ray Cashmere played his 50th game for the club.
 Round 25: Shane Tronc played his 100th game for the club.

Squad List

Squad Movement

2008 Gains

2008 Losses

Ladder

Fixtures

Pre-season

Regular season

Statistics 

Source:

Representatives 
The following players have played a representative match in 2008

Honours

League 
 Wally Lewis Medal: Johnathan Thurston

Club 
 Paul Bowman Medal: Aaron Payne
 Player's Player: Aaron Payne
 Club Person of the Year: Aaron Payne
 Rookie of the Year: Nick Slyney
 Most Improved: Brandon Boor
 NYC Player of the Year: Nick Slyney

Feeder Clubs

National Youth Competition 
  North Queensland Cowboys - 16th, Wooden Spoon

Queensland Cup 
  Mackay Cutters - 9th, missed finals
  Northern Pride - 3rd, lost preliminary final

References 

North Queensland Cowboys seasons
North Queensland Cowboys season